General elections were held in India between 1 and 10 March 1971 to elect members of the 5th Lok Sabha. They were the fifth general elections since independence in 1947. The 27 Indian states and union territories were represented by 518 constituencies, each with a single seat. Under the leadership of Indira Gandhi, the Indian National Congress (R) led a campaign which focused on reducing poverty and won a landslide victory, overcoming a split in the party and regaining many of the seats lost in the previous election.

Background

Congress party split
During her previous term, there had been internal divisions in the Indian National Congress between Indira Gandhi and the party establishment, especially Morarji Desai. In 1969, she was expelled from the party, causing a split. Most of the Congress MPs and grassroots support joined Gandhi's INC(R) faction, which was recognised by the Election Commission as being the successor to the previous party. 31 MPs who opposed Gandhi formed Indian National Congress (Organisation) party.

Minority government
The Second Indira Gandhi government, formed in November 1969 and dissolved in March 1971, was the first minority government in independent India. After the split, the INC(R) held 221 seats in the 523-seat parliament, 41 seats short of a majority. However, Gandhi and her cabinet remained in power by relying on outside support from the Communists who had 42 seats and the Dravida Munnetra Kazhagam which had 26 seats, giving the government a total of 289 seats, a comfortable majority and far more than the minimum of 262 seats required for a majority. Knowing that her minority government would eventually fall, on 27 December 1970, President V.V. Giri dissolved the Lok Sabha at the recommendation of Gandhi.

Opposition alliance
 
INC(O) formed a pre-poll alliance with Samyukta Socialist Party (SSP), Praja Socialist Party (PSP), the Swatantra Party and Bharatiya Jana Sangh BJS and several other regional parties opposed to the INC(R). They agreed to field one candidate against the INC(R) candidate in every constituency in order to defeat Gandhi's party.

Results
Despite the split, the ruling faction gained votes and seats to win a strong majority, while the Grand Alliance was badly trounced and lost more than half of their seats.

Results by state

Aftermath
On 12 June 1975, the Allahabad High Court invalidated the result in Gandhi's constituency on the grounds of electoral malpractices. Instead of resigning, Indira Gandhi called a state of emergency, suspending democracy and outlawed political opposition. After democracy was restored in 1977, the opposition Congress faction formed a coalition of parties called the Janata Party, which inflicted the Congress' first electoral defeat.

See also
Election Commission of India
1969 Indian presidential election

References

 
General
India
General elections in India